Eda Şahin (born 26 August 1999) is a Turkish female basketball player. The  national plays Point guard.

Career
She was trained in Galatasaray girls' basketball academy. He signed a contract with the A team in the 2016-17 season.

References

External links
 Eda Şahin at Galatasaray.org
 Eda Şahin at Tbf.org

1999 births
Living people
Galatasaray S.K. (women's basketball) players
Turkish women's basketball players
Point guards
Hatay Büyükşehir Belediyesi (women's basketball) players